The Khom script is a writing system used in Laos. The term "Khom" is also used to refer to the Ancient Khmer lettering used in Thailand's Buddhist temples to inscribe sacred Buddhist mantras and prayers, but that is an entirely different script.

History
The script was invented by Ong Kommadam, a leader in the rebellion against the French colonizers.  He began using the script as early as 1924, but its use did not continue after his death in 1936.  Ong Kommadam claimed supernatural titles, including “King of the Khom”, “God of the Khom”, “Sky God of the Khom” (Sidwell 2008:17). The script was linked to his divine claims, messages written in this script carried mystical power as well as meaning. The script was invented for conveying secret messages that could not be deciphered by the French or Siamese forces that had divided Laos by Ong Kommandam, who had taken over as leader after the death of Ong Kèo during the Holy Man's Rebellion.  As Ong Kommandam and many of his closest followers were speakers of Bahnaric languages spoken in southern Laos, most of the known texts in the language were written in Alak—Ong Kommandam's native language—and the Bahnaric Loven languages of Juk, Su' and Jru', and some in Lao.

The script was revealed to outsiders by old, dying insiders on two occasions (Sidwell 2008). Although the word Khom originally referred to the Khmer, it was later applied to related Austroasiatic peoples such as the Lao Theung, many of which had supported Ong Kammandam.

Characteristics
This Khom script is unusual in the way it divides syllables.  It has one set of symbols to represent initial consonants.  Then it uses another set of symbols to represent the final vowel and consonant.  That is, unlike a syllabary (which has unitary symbols for consonants followed by vowels (CV), with maybe a vowelless consonant following), Khom script divides the syllable as C-VC, rather than CV-C (Sidwell 2008). This onset-rime division is not readily accommodated in any of the existing typologies of scripts, though shared by Zhuyin Fuhao.

Some of the symbols resemble those from nearby scripts, but many are original. The script contains more than 300 characters, in order to fully encompass the rich morphology of the Bahnaric languages.
Although the shapes of the letters have a superficial resemblance to several writing systems in the area, it was not related to any of them. 

The script could be used to write various Bahnaric languages, including the Laven dialects, especially Jru', and languages like Alak, Ong Kommadam's native language.

Notes

References

Jacq, Pascale. 2001. A Description of Jruq (Loven): a Mon-Khmer language of the Lao PDR. Unpublished MA thesis, Australian National University. (Script described in appendix II, pp. 521–525)
Sidwell, Paul. 2008.  The Khom script of the Kommodam Rebellion.  International Journal of the Sociology of Language 192.

Writing systems
Constructed scripts